Hybusa is a genus of neotropical stick-mimicking grasshoppers, the only genus in the subfamily Hybusinae. They are herbivorous.

Species 
, species include:
 Hybusa armaticollis (Blanchard, 1851)
 Hybusa coniceps (Blanchard, 1851)
 Hybusa minuta Mello-Leitão, 1939
 Hybusa occidentalis (Westwood, 1843)

References

Proscopiidae
Caelifera genera
Orthoptera of South America
Taxa named by Wilhelm Ferdinand Erichson